John Steven Clark (born March 21, 1947) is an American politician who was the longest-serving attorney general in Arkansas history. Born in Leachville, Arkansas to John W. Clark and Jean Bearden Clark, Clark decided early on that he wanted to be a politician. He graduated from Arkansas State University and received a Juris Doctor degree at the University of Arkansas School of Law prior to briefly practicing law.

References

Arkansas Attorneys General
Arkansas Democrats
1947 births
Arkansas State University alumni
University of Arkansas School of Law alumni
People from Mississippi County, Arkansas
Living people